Venomm or Horatio Venomm is a fictional character appearing in American comic books published by Marvel Comics.

Publication history

Venomm first appeared in Jungle Action #6 and was created by Don McGregor and Rich Buckler.

Fictional character biography
Horatio Walter grew up a loner. As a cruel prank, Bruce Morgan threw a vial of acid in Horatio's face causing it to look like a zombie's face. Having become a recluse, Horatio befriended some snakes which were shunned like he was. While studying them, Horatio developed an immunity to their venom. While taking some night classes, Horatio was saved by Erik Killmonger who recruited him in his plans to invade Wakanda.

Stowing away on a plane sent from Wakanda, Venomm made his way to the Wakandan Vibranium mines to attack the Black Panther. However, the Black Panther beat Venomm into submission. Within the Wakandan prison, a man named Taku tried to establish a friendship with Venomm, but Venomm just distracted Taku so that Malice could free him. The Black Panther returned and drove off Malice, while W'Kabi choked Venomm into submission and was then re-imprisoned. Taku continued to try to reach Venomm, but when W'Kabi attempted to interrogate Venomm, Venomm attacked both of them and escaped. Venomm returned to his snakepit, and the Black Panther followed him there. Venomm sent a small army of constrictors and poisonous snakes against him, but Taku had followed the Black Panther, and when Venomm was unable to allow Taku to be harmed, he surrendered to the Black Panther. When Killmonger assaulted Central Wakanda, Venomm was able to escape the prison again. Having grown disenchanted with the insurrection, he stopped King Kadaver's psychic assault on Taku, and got Cadaver killed by one of his own dinosaurs. In the aftermath of the battle, based on the recommendation of Taku, Venomm was pardoned of his crimes and released.

Venomm later lived in the Wakandan Palace alongside Taku. A CIA agent had secretly embedded a transmitter under the skin of Venomm's giant pet python Matilda, causing the Black Panther to initially think that Venomm was a spy in their midst, but when he learned the truth the Black Panther removed the transmitter from her head. Venomm maintained a position of trust within the Wakandan Palace, where be befriended Nick Collins, the son of Michael Collins. Under the command of their king, the Black Panther, all of Wakanda marched onto the land of the Jabari to punish the Man-Ape for murdering a doppelganger version of the Black Panther. Venomm was at the front lines in the midst of the army and tribal warriors, and battled Jabari tribesmen during the conflict.

He briefly reappeared as one of the villains summoned by Sin to battle Earth's heroes. He joined the DOA's battle against the Avengers and other heroes at the DOA's HQ in South Carolina, but was knocked unconscious by Iron Fist.

Writer Don McGregor created Venomm with the intention from the beginning of showing him with Taku as lovers, but due to censorship at the time he could not show it explicitly. However, in Black Panther: Panther's Prey #2, he revealed a little more of their intimate relationship when they are called "companions" and W'Kabi compares their relationship to his marriage to his wife.

Powers and abilities
Venomm can control the behavior of snakes through training, chemicals, and apparently some form of psionic influence. Venomm has built up within himself an immunity to all but the most venomous snake venom. Venomm's face was scarred by acid so that it looks corpse-like.

Reception
 In 2022, Screen Rant included Venomm in their "15 Most Powerful Black Panther Villains" list.

References

External links
 Venomm at Marvel.com
 Venomm at Marvel Wiki
 

Characters created by Don McGregor
Comics characters introduced in 1973
Fictional gay males
Fictional poets
Marvel Comics LGBT superheroes
Marvel Comics LGBT supervillains
Marvel Comics superheroes
Marvel Comics supervillains
Wakandans